Sergei Aleksandrovich Mylnikov (6 October 1958 – 20 June 2017) was a Soviet and Russian ice hockey goaltender and coach who competed in the Soviet Hockey League, National Hockey League, and the Swedish Division 2 between 1977 and 1995.

He was the first Soviet goaltender to play in the National Hockey League. He mostly played for Traktor Chelyabinsk (1976–80, 1983–89), and also briefly for SKA Leningrad (1980–82), the Quebec Nordiques (1989–90), Torpedo Yaroslavl (1991–93) and Skedvi/Säter IF (1993–95). He was a member of the Soviet national team, winning a gold medal at the 1988 Winter Olympics and at the 1989 and 1990 IIHF World Championships. He was named to the Soviet All-Star team in 1988 and inducted into the Russian and Soviet Hockey Hall of Fame in 1985. Mylnikov helped the Soviet junior team to back-to-back junior world championships in 1977 and 1978. He was also the starting Soviet goaltender at the Canada Cup in 1987.

Playing career
Mylnikov took up hockey at the age of 6, encouraged by his father, and took up goaltender position because of his relatively small stature. His international debut was delayed by a strong competition from multiple gifted Soviet goaltenders, including Vladislav Tretiak and Vladimir Myshkin. Mylnikov finished his career with Säter IF in Sweden in 1995, and remained there as the head coach for two seasons (1995–97). After that he trained several Russian clubs in 1997–2012. He also continued playing masters hockey until 2010, when he had a major heart surgery. He died in 2017 at the age of 58, and was survived by sons Dmitri and Sergei Jr., a brother, and a nephew – all of whom were ice hockey goaltenders.

Career statistics

Regular season and playoffs

International

References

External links
 

1958 births
2017 deaths
Burials in Troyekurovskoye Cemetery
Ice hockey players at the 1988 Winter Olympics
Lokomotiv Yaroslavl players
Medalists at the 1988 Winter Olympics
Olympic gold medalists for the Soviet Union
Olympic ice hockey players of the Soviet Union
Olympic medalists in ice hockey
Quebec Nordiques draft picks
Quebec Nordiques players
Russian ice hockey goaltenders
SKA Saint Petersburg players
Soviet expatriate sportspeople in Canada
Soviet expatriate ice hockey players
Soviet ice hockey goaltenders
Sportspeople from Chelyabinsk
Traktor Chelyabinsk players
Honoured Masters of Sport of the USSR
Expatriate ice hockey players in Canada
Expatriate ice hockey players in Hungary
Expatriate ice hockey players in Sweden
Russian expatriate ice hockey people
Russian expatriate sportspeople in Sweden
Russian expatriate sportspeople in Hungary